Two human polls made up the 2010–11 NCAA Division I men's ice hockey rankings, the USCHO.com/CBS College Sports poll and the USA Today/USA Hockey Magazine poll. As the 2010–11 season progressed, rankings were updated weekly.

Legend

USCHO

USA Today/USA Hockey Magazine

References

External links
USA Today/USA Hockey Magazine Men's College Hockey Poll
USCHO.com/CBS College Sports Division I Men's Poll

Ra
College men's ice hockey rankings in the United States